XHUJED-TDT is a television station located in Durango, Durango. Broadcasting on digital channel 28, XHUJED is owned by the Universidad Juárez del Estado de Durango and is a sister to XHHD-FM 100.5.

History
The university received a permit for a television station on October 2, 2012; at the same time, Cofetel also gave it permission to move the university's AM radio station to FM. The university began transmitting through cable and over the internet, while the over-the-air TV station signed on March 21, 2014.

In 2015, the IFT allowed XHUJED to move from Cerro de los Remedios to a new site northwest of the city.

In March 2018, in order to facilitate the repacking of TV services out of the 600 MHz band (channels 38-51), XHUJED was assigned channel 28 for continued digital operations.

Programming
XHUJED programming includes a newscast covering university events, Noticias UJED, that airs three times daily, as well as other UJED, local and national cultural programming.

References

External links

Television stations in Durango
Public television in Mexico